Ruth Wyler Messinger (born November 6, 1940) is a former American political leader in New York City and a member of the Democratic Party. She was the Democratic nominee for Mayor of New York City in 1997, losing to incumbent mayor Rudy Giuliani.

Biography

Life 
Born and raised in New York, Messinger attended the Brearley School. She graduated from Radcliffe College of Harvard University in 1962 and received a Master of Social Work from the University of Oklahoma in 1964. She is married to Andrew Lachman, her second husband, and has three children. She was formerly the President and CEO of American Jewish World Service, an international development agency.

Politics
Messinger was a delegate to the 1980 Democratic National Convention and served on the New York City Council from 1978 to 1989, representing the Upper West Side of Manhattan. In the City Council, she proposed extending rent control from individuals to businesses. From 1990 to 1998, she served as Manhattan borough president, an office she gave up to unsuccessfully run for mayor in the 1997 election. Her candidacy made her the city's first female Democratic mayoral candidate.

A political liberal, Messinger was known for her advocacy on behalf of public schools, efforts to achieve compromise between developers and neighborhood activists, and her aggressive media work. She is pro-choice and opposes the death penalty. During her 1997 campaign, she was nearly forced into a Democratic primary runoff with Reverend Al Sharpton, but avoided it by receiving 40% of the vote during a recount. She ultimately lost to Giuliani but received more than 500,000 votes.

In 2005, Messinger endorsed Fernando Ferrer for mayor in the 2005 mayoral election. Ferrer had briefly run against her for mayor in 1997, before dropping out to endorse her and then run for reelection as Bronx borough president.

Post-political career

From 1998 until 2016 she was President and CEO of American Jewish World Service before transitioning to an Ambassador role with the organization. 

In late 2005, following a high-profile year that included the Asian tsunami and Hurricane Katrina, The Forward, a Jewish newspaper based in New York City, named her to the top of its annual "Forward Fifty" list of the most influential American Jews. Messinger is also a board member of Hazon and a trustee emerita of the Jewish Foundation for Education of Women. In 2015 she was named as one of The Forward 50.

Messinger serves as the inaugural Social Justice Fellow at the Jewish Theological Seminary of America and the Social Justice Activist-in-Residence at the JCC of Manhattan.

In 2020, she served on incoming Queens Borough President Donovan Richards' transition team.

See also
 1997 New York City mayoral election

References

External links
Ruth Messinger's articles at American Jewish World Service website

|-

|-

1940 births
20th-century American politicians
20th-century American women politicians
American women chief executives
Brearley School alumni
Candidates in the 1997 United States elections
Jewish American people in New York (state) politics
Living people
Manhattan borough presidents
New York (state) Democrats
New York City Council members
Radcliffe College alumni
University of Oklahoma alumni
Women New York City Council members